is a Japanese actor.

Early life
Kase was born in Yokohama, Kanagawa prefecture. He moved to Bellevue, Washington in the United States soon after his birth, due to his father's job being transferred.
His father  Yutaka Kase was former chairman and representative director of Sojitz, a Japanese general trading company.

Career
Kase made his screen debut in Sogo Ishii's Gojoe: Spirit War Chronicle in 2000.

He starred in Masayuki Suo's 2007 film I Just Didn't Do It.

International films 
He has also appeared in films such as Clint Eastwood's Letters from Iwo Jima, Michel Gondry's Tokyo!, Gus Van Sant's Restless, Abbas Kiarostami's Like Someone in Love, Hong Sang-soo's Hill of Freedom, Takeshi Kitano's Outrage,/ Outrage Beyond,  Martin Scorsese's Silence and Paul Weitz's Bel Canto.

Filmography

Film

Television
 Penance (2012)
 Zoku. Saigo Kara Nibanme no Koi (2014)
 Kono Machi no Inochi ni (2016)
 Mozart in the Jungle (2018)

Writings 
"Minna no Ozu-kai" in Ozu Yasujiro Taizen (The Complete Book of Ozu Yasujiro) by Matsuura Kanji and Miyamoto Akiko (Asahi Shimbun Publications Inc. 2019)

Bibliography
 Bellevue Ryo Kase (July 2006, Media Factory)

Awards

2004
 14th Japan Film Professional Awards Best Actor

2007
 17th Japan Film Professional Awards: Best Actor for I Just Didn't Do It
 81st Kinema Junpo Award: Best Actor for I Just Didn't Do It
 21st Takasaki Film Festival: Best Supporting Actor

2008
 31st Japan Academy Prize: Best Actor for I Just Didn't Do It
 32nd Hochi Film Award: Best Actor for I Just Didn't Do It
 50th Blue Ribbon Awards: Best Actor for I Just Didn't Do It
 29th Yokohama Film Festival: Best Actor for I Just Didn't Do It
 3rd Osaka Cinema Festival: Best Actor for I Just Didn't Do It
 2nd Asian Film Awards: Best Actor for I Just Didn't Do It
 27th Zenkoku Eiren Awards: Best Actor for I Just Didn't Do It

2010
 1st Nippon Theater Staff Film Festival: Best Supporting Actor

2013
 67th Mainichi Film Award: Best Supporting Actor for Beyond Outrage

References

External links

 Agency profile
 Facebook
 

1974 births
Living people
Japanese male film actors
Japanese male television actors
Male actors from Yokohama
21st-century Japanese male actors
Japanese expatriates in the United States
People from Bellevue, Washington
Male actors from Washington (state)